Gilbert Juma Deya is a stonemason turned evangelist who lived in Britain from the mid-1990s until 2017, when  he was extradited to Kenya to face charges of stealing five children between 1999 and 2004, which he denies.  His organization, Gilbert Deya Ministries, claims that Deya is able to help infertile women to conceive through the power of prayer.

Background
Deya was born in the morning of 2 February 1937 in Juja, Kiambu County, outside of Nairobi and was the eleventh child in a family of fifteen children. He belongs to Luo tribe, and his name "Juma" means Sunday, which is the day he was born. His father, Samuel Oyanda Deya was a sisal plantations worker from Bondo working in Juja. His parents were never meant to be a couple because his mother, Monica Nono Deya, declined the arranged marriage with his father.

He attended primary school but the school preacher dropped out because of bullying and poverty. He started preaching Jinja, Kampala, in Uganda, where he beat up a woman for hitting the children of his sister and worked there as a porter.

He married his 14-year-old wife, Mary Anyango, on 27 December 1958 when he was 21. They gave birth to fifteen children in total. He started the "Salvation of Jesus Christ Church" in 1976.

He was ordained by the United Evangelical Church of Kenya and styles himself "Archbishop". He was an evangelist in Kenya in the late 1980s to early 1990s, but moved to the UK, establishing Gilbert Deya Ministries in 1997. The ministry now has churches in Liverpool, London, Birmingham, Nottingham, Luton, Reading, and Manchester, Sheffield and in 2006 acquired a building and planning permission in Leeds. The church claims to be "the fastest growing Ministry in the UK and worldwide".

'Miracle Babies' & child trafficking
The Gilbert Deya Ministries claim that Deya's powers allow him to be able to cause infertile women to become pregnant. Deya claims that "through the power of prayer and the Lord Jesus" he has helped sterile women give birth. In the UK, one woman is claimed to have had three children in less than a year. The women travelled to Kenya in order to "give birth".
 
Deya's wife, Eddah (also known as Mary Deya), was arrested during November 2004 in Nairobi and charged with stealing children. Ten children, none of whom had any genetic connection to the Deya family, were found at Deya's House. Twenty babies have been placed in foster care in Kenya after DNA tests showed they had no connection to their alleged mothers.
Rose Atieno Kiserem, a former pastor with Deya's ministry was jailed along with Mrs. Deya. Upon her release from jail, Kiserem confessed that the 'miracle babies' were "a hoax created by the Deyas and their accomplices to deceive me and other God-fearing people."

Deya has a warrant out for his arrest in Kenya for the trafficking of babies out of the country. The Kenyan police have alleged that the ministry is a baby-snatching ring, and they have petitioned for his extradition from the UK. Deya is seeking political asylum from his base in Glasgow. He was arrested by police at Edinburgh Sheriff Court in 2006.

In November 2004 the High Court in the UK ruled that a 'miracle baby' in London was the victim of child trafficking, and that the supposed miracle displayed was a ruse in order to generate funds from a "deceived congregation". Justice Ryder ruled that in order to maintain the illusion of a genuine birth, the child's 'mother' was seriously assaulted "and a live child who had been born to another family was presented to her as her child." He also ruled that "[the baby's] birth as described was a falsehood not a miracle."

On 13 December 2006, Deya was arrested in London by the Metropolitan Police. A police spokesman said Gilbert Deya was detained under an arrest warrant issued by Kenyan authorities, who had charged him with child abduction and trafficking. He was ordered by a court on 8 November 2007, to be extradited from the UK to Kenya to face five counts of child stealing.

Deya appealed against extradition on the grounds that he might face torture in Kenya, but in late 2008 his case was rejected by the High Court and leave to appeal to the House of Lords was refused.
It was reported in April 2010 that Deya was still in England and that David Lammy, Deya's MP, had enquired of the government why he had not yet been extradited. Lammy was concerned that justice was being denied to several of his constituents who were victims of the trafficked babies fraud. The Home Office responded that it was still considering representations from Deya's solicitors that sending him to Kenya would breach his human rights.

In September 2011, news reports indicated that all avenues of appeal had been exhausted and Deya would now be extradited to Kenya.

In December 2011, a court in Kenya cleared Mary Deya of obtaining registration for five children irregularly.

The London Evening Standard reported on 21 October 2016 that Deya had applied for a judicial review of the decision to extradite him.

On 12 July 2017, Premier Christian Media reported that the High Court had refused Deya's application for a judicial review and that he would be extradited.

On 3 August 2017, Deya was extradited from the UK to Kenya to face child trafficking charges. He was immediately arraigned in court for child trafficking offences.

In April 2020, Deya's hearing was delayed because of COVID-19. However, the case resumed in early 2021. Deya's legal team launched a bid to block prosecutors from calling several witnesses from abroad whose testimonies had been halted because of COVID-19. However, Chief Magistrate Francis Andayi denied the motion.

References 

Kenyan evangelicals
Living people
People extradited from the United Kingdom
People extradited to Kenya
Kenyan emigrants to the United Kingdom
Year of birth missing (living people)